História de Amor is a Brazilian telenovela produced and displayed at the time of 18 hours by TV Globo, July 3, 1995 to March 2, 1996, in 209 chapters.

It was written by Manoel Carlos, in collaboration with Elizabeth Jhin, Marcus Toledo and Maria Carolina, directed by Ricardo Waddington, Roberto Naar and Alexander Avancini, artistic direction of Paul Ubiratan, direction, production Ruy Mattos.

The novel was Regina Duarte, José Mayer, Carla Marins, Carolina Ferraz, Eva Wilma, Cláudio Corrêa e Castro, Nuno Leal Maia, Lília Cabral, José de Abreu and Ângelo Paes Leme playing their central roles in the plot.

Synopsis 
Helena (Regina Duarte) is a sweet, honest, sensitive and very warlike woman who faces the untimely severity of her daughter Joyce (Carla Marins), who in turn is abandoned by her boyfriend, the irresponsible Caio (Ângelo Paes Leme). The biggest problem is the girl's father, Assunção (Nuno Leal Maia), Helena's ex-husband, who tries to blame his daughter's pregnancy on Helena's morals.

Single and alone, Helena arises a passion for endocrinologist Carlos Alberto (José Mayer), and has her feelings matched. But Carlos is committed to a possessive Paula (Carolina Ferraz), madly in love with him, who suffers from constant bouts of jealousy. Her parents, Zuleika (Eva Wilma) and Rômulo (Cláudio Correia e Castro), are looking forward to or marrying their daughter with Carlos, who will save the family from financial decline.

But Carlos is the kind of man that as women really do not forget. Even married to Paula and in love with Helena, he is still besieged by ex-wife Sheyla (Lília Cabral), who does not like to have lost him and dreams of a rapprochement.

Cast 

 Supporting cast

 Alexia Deschamps - Márcia Vieira Salles
 Andréa Avancini - cliente de Carlos
 André Ricardo - Luiz Assunção (Luizinho)
 Buza Ferraz - Marcos
 Carolyna Aguiar - Lu
 Edson Silva - Ramiro
 Fábio Junqueira - Fabrício
 Felipe Vasconcelos - Walter
 Fernanda Nobre - Student Assunção
 Francisco Carvalho - Zé
 Ilva Niño - Chica
 Ingrid Fridman - Ritinha Xavier
 Isabela Bicalho - Elizete
 Jorge Cherques - Noé
 Jorge Coutinho - Ernani
 José Augusto Branco - Dr. Alfredo (doctor who examines Olga)
 Joyce Santos - Kátia
 Júlia Almeida - Duda
 Júnior Prata - Herculano (Gas station attendant where Paula and Helena fight)
 Larissa Queiroz - Student Assunção
 Licurgo Spínola - doctor
 Milton Gonçalves - priest
 Nica Bonfim - Roseli (wife of Ramiro)
 Nívea Stelmann - Store clerk
 Sérgio Hondjakoff - Student Assunção
 Tatiana Issa - Louise
 Thomas Morkos - Zezinho
 Úrsula Corona - Aninha

External links

1995 Brazilian television series debuts
1996 Brazilian television series endings
1995 telenovelas
TV Globo telenovelas
Brazilian telenovelas
Portuguese-language telenovelas